Gualterio Looser Schallemberg (September 4, 1898, Santiago – July 22, 1982) was a Chilean botanist and engineer of Swiss parentage. He owned a factory that made agricultural implements.

In 1928 Looser joined the American Fern Society, and started to publish papers on the pteridophytes of Chile. His herbarium containing ca. 8000 specimens was given to Conservatoire et Jardin botaniques de la Ville de Genève.

Some taxa described by G Looser

 Boldea boldus (=Peumus boldus).
 Cryptocarya alba (Molina) Looser.
 Laureliopsis philippiana (Looser) Schodde as Laurelia.
 Sticherus squamulosus (Desv.) Nakai var. gunckelianus (Looser) R. Rodr. et Ponce as Dicranopteris.

Notes

20th-century Chilean botanists
Pteridologists
Chilean people of Swiss-German descent
Scientists from Santiago
1898 births
1982 deaths